The women's 80 metres hurdles  event at the 1948 Summer Olympic Games took place on 3 and 4 August. The final was won by Dutch athlete Fanny Blankers-Koen.

Records
Prior to the competition, the existing World and Olympic records were as follows.

The following new Olympic record was set during this competition:

Schedule
All times are British Summer Time (UTC+1)

Results

Round 1
Round 1 took place on 3 August. The fastest three runners in each heat advanced to the semifinals.

Heat 1

Heat 2

Heat 3

Heat 4

Semifinals
Semifinals took place on 3 August. The top three runners from each heat advanced to the final.

Heat 1

Heat 2

Final

Key: Est = Time is an estimate, OR = Olympic record

Wind: 1.9 m/s

References

External links
Organising Committee for the XIV Olympiad, The (1948). The Official Report of the Organising Committee for the XIV Olympiad. LA84 Foundation. Retrieved 5 September 2016.

Athletics at the 1948 Summer Olympics
Sprint hurdles at the Olympics
1948 in women's athletics
Ath